The Community Planning and Development agency within the United States Department of Housing and Urban Development (HUD) administers the grant programs that help communities plan and finance their growth and development, increase their capacity to govern, and provide shelter and services for homeless people. HUD is a national program, and HUD provides funding directly to larger cities and counties, and for smaller cities and counties, generally to state government. HUD's programs include the Community Development Block Grant Program and the HOME program.

One of the office's main functions is dispersing the Community Development Block Grant (CBDG) as it does not directly provide full-fledged services, but instead aims to build partnerships with the public sector with the private sector, regardless if they are non-profit or not.

Other grant focuses are on Indian Tribes, self-help for those who wish to own their homes, people who live in rural areas, and youth.

Structure
The agency is headed by an Assistant Secretary, who oversees the following: 

 Assistant Secretary of Housing and Urban Development for Community Planning and Development
 Principal Assistant Secretary of Housing and Urban Development for Community Planning and Development
 Deputy Assistant Secretary for Operations
 Deputy Assistant Secretary for Economic Development
 Deputy Assistant Secretary for Special Needs
 Deputy Assistant Secretary for Grant Programs
 Director, Office of Field Management
 Director, Office of Policy Development and Coordination
 Director, Office of Technical Assistance and Management
 Director, Office of Rural Housing and Economic Development
 Director, Office of HIV/AIDS Housing
 Director, Office of Special Needs Assistance Programs 
 Director, Office of Affordable Housing Programs
 Director, Office of Block Grant Assistance
 Director, Office of Environment and Energy

The Office of Grant Programs oversees affordable housing and community development programs, including the Community Development Block Grant Program (CDBG), the HOME Investment Partnerships program, the Housing Trust Fund, and CDBG Disaster Recovery funds, in addition to Department-wide energy and environmental policy.

The Office of Economic Development creates Promise Zones that are meant to revamp impoverished areas by attracting private investment and increasing affordable housing.

The Office for Special Needs, works to administer the homeless assistance programs HUD runs

The Office of Field Operations is meant to support Multifamily Headquarters, Regional Offices and their stakeholders.

 the Acting Assistant Secretary is Arthur Jemison.

Controversies
Housing of Urban Development has been characterized as corrupt, due to the distributing of money to city bosses, and the Office of Community Planning and Development has not been without its controversies.

The office has been critiqued for providing more of their grant funding to the districts of the elected officials who oversee HUD's programs And in 1994 the office purchased software meant to view communities and their unemployment rates and income, which has been seen as an indirect way to also map crime, which would influence on what areas would receive funds.

Appropriations
For Fiscal Year 2015 the office's appropriations Budget was $6.4 billion dollars, with nearly half of that intended to be used for CDBG, which has consistently been the focus of critics against wasteful spending.

Homeless Assistance Grants is their second largest program with $2.1 billion dollars planned for providing Homeless Assistance, often for those who have suddenly lost their home after an emergency. The Continuum of Care Grant they disperse has been noted as being very selective and successful with granting funds to those that “effectively discharge homeless people” to permanent housing and services needed to live independently.

In early 2017, President Donald Trump proposed eliminating the CBDG as it is "not well-targeted to the poorest populations" along with the HOME grants as "State and local governments are better positioned to serve their communities based on local needs and priorities."

See also
 Title 24 of the Code of Federal Regulations

References

External links
 

United States Department of Housing and Urban Development agencies